Ibrahima Cissé (born 15 February 2001) is a professional footballer who plays as a defender for Bundesliga club Schalke 04. Born in France, he has represented Mali at international youth level.

Early life 
Cissé was born in Dreux, Eure-et-Loir, France, in a family with Malian origins, with two of his elders brothers – Salif and Kalifa – who also embraced a professional footballing career.

Club career 
Cissé came through the youth ranks of La Berrichonne de Châteauroux in his native region, before moving to Gent in 2019.

He made his professional debut for Gent on the 9 December 2021, replacing Michael Ngadeu-Ngadjui at the 62nd minute of a 1–0 Europa Conference League home win against FC Flora.

On 3 May 2022, he agreed to join Schalke 04 on a free transfer for the 2022–23 season, signing a four-year contract.

International career 
Cissé is an under-20 international with Mali, with whom it took part in the 2021 Africa Cup of Nations qualifiers.

Career statistics

References

External links
Profile at the FC Schalke 04 website

2001 births
Living people
Sportspeople from Dreux
Malian footballers
Mali under-20 international footballers
French footballers
French sportspeople of Malian descent
Association football defenders
K.A.A. Gent players
FC Schalke 04 players
FC Schalke 04 II players
Belgian Pro League players
Regionalliga players
Malian expatriate sportspeople in Belgium
French expatriate footballers
French expatriate sportspeople in Belgium
Expatriate footballers in Belgium
Footballers from Centre-Val de Loire